Kozłówka Landscape Park (Kozłowiecki Park Krajobrazowy) is a protected area (Landscape Park) situated in south-eastern Poland, in Lubartów County, Lublin Voivodeship.

It takes its name from the village of Kozłówka.

References

External links
Photographs
Google Map

See also
List of landscape parks of Poland
Kozie Góry
Kozłówka, Lublin Voivodeship

Landscape parks in Poland
Parks in Lublin Voivodeship